The Mid Penna Reservoir Dam, also known as the MPR Dam, is an irrigation project located across the Penna river in the Anantapur district of Andhra Pradesh, India. It works mainly as a balancing reservoir under the Tungabhadra high-level irrigation canal, which originates from the Tungabhadra Dam. It is situated in the Bhadrampalle and Vajrakarur villages.

References

Dams in Andhra Pradesh
Buildings and structures in Anantapur district
Year of establishment missing